Unreal 3 may refer to:

 Unreal Tournament 3, a multiplayer video game by Epic Games 
 Unreal Engine 3, a computer game engine developed by Epic Games